The 1928–29 Elitserien season was the second season of the Elitserien, the top level ice hockey league in Sweden. Six teams participated in the league, and IK Gota won the league title for the second consecutive year.

Final standings

External links
 1928-29 season

Elitserien (1927–1935) seasons
1928–29 in Swedish ice hockey
Sweden